"Over the Wall" is a single by Echo & the Bunnymen which was released in 1981 in Australia and is from the 1981 album Heaven Up Here. The b-side of the single, which was not released in any other country, was the title track from the band's 1980 debut album, Crocodiles. Unlike the band's previous singles, "Over the Wall" was released without a picture sleeve.

Track listings
All tracks written by Will Sergeant, Ian McCulloch, Les Pattinson and Pete de Freitas.

Australian 7" release (WEA 100174)
"Over the Wall"
"Crocodiles"

Personnel

Musicians
Ian McCulloch – vocals, guitar
Will Sergeant – lead guitar
Les Pattinson – bass
Pete de Freitas – drums

References

1981 singles
Echo & the Bunnymen songs
Songs written by Ian McCulloch (singer)
Songs written by Will Sergeant
Songs written by Les Pattinson
Songs written by Pete de Freitas
1981 songs
Warner Music Group singles
Song recordings produced by Hugh Jones (producer)